Roger Patrick Blundell Drayton  (4 January 1925 – 21 June 1986) was a New Zealand politician of the Labour Party.

Biography

Early life and career
Drayton was born in Templeton. He attended schools at Sockburn and Hornby before finishing his education at Christchurch Boys' High School.

Drayton trained at Wigram after enlisting in the Royal New Zealand Air Force (RNZAF) in 1944, serving until 1969, by which time he had risen to the rank of Squadron leader. He served in the administrative section of the RNZAF and served abroad in Australia, Fiji and Singapore. Following World War II he was employed as a computer systems analyst for the Ministry of Defence.

He was a keen sportsman and represented the RNZAF services teams in both cricket and soccer. He was the secretary of the Combined Services Sports Council in 1959. In 1955, he became secretary of the Ellesmere Cricket Association.

Member of Parliament

He represented the St Albans electorate from 1969 to 1978, when he retired. Drayton had a well—earned reputation as one of the best campaigners in the Labour Party after winning a previously thought marginal seat by over 900 votes and increasing his majority after that. Consequently, he was often sought out for advice from candidates and backbench colleagues. Drayton, according to Auckland MP Warren Freer, would never let anyone forget that he was from and represented Christchurch.

After the formation of the Third Labour Government he stood for a seat in the cabinet. He was not elected, which Prime Minister Norman Kirk regretted. He then put himself forward for the positions of Chairman of Committees and junior government whip, but was unsuccessful. In 1973, he stood unsuccessfully for the Labour Party vice-presidency, but was beaten by Grey Lynn MP Eddie Isbey. When Labour was unexpectedly defeated, Drayton retained his seat and in January 1976, he was appointed by Labour leader Bill Rowling as Shadow Minister of State Services. From 1977 to 1978 he was Shadow Minister of Defence. He became Labour's caucus secretary and later was Chief Opposition Whip between 1976 and 1978.

Later life and death
Drayton died at his home in Paraparaumu after a long illness aged 61, survived by his wife, son and daughter.

Notes

References

 

|-

|-

1925 births
1986 deaths
People educated at Christchurch Boys' High School
New Zealand Labour Party MPs
New Zealand military personnel of World War II
Royal New Zealand Air Force personnel
Members of the New Zealand House of Representatives
New Zealand MPs for Christchurch electorates
20th-century New Zealand politicians
Cricketers from Christchurch
New Zealand justices of the peace